Henry Myers (1827 – March 20, 1901) was a lieutenant-commander in the United States Navy.

Life and career
Myers was born in 1827 to Mordecai Myers and Sarah Henrietta Cohen. His father was the only survivor from his family of fifteen after their home was swept into the ocean in Georgetown, South Carolina, during a hurricane on September 27, 1822. His father buried the victims, which included his parents.

He was appointed paymaster in the United States Navy early in his life. When Georgia seceded in the Civil War, he joined the Confederate States Navy. He was ordered to the CSS Sumter, commanded by Raphael Semmes. When he died, he was one of the last surviving members of the vessel.

Myers was captured in Tangier in 1862. The Sumter was not seaworthy at the time, and was in dock at Cádiz. Myers had travelled to Tangier on a leave of absence to visit an English officer friend who was ill. He was seized by the acting U.S. Consul in Tangier and put on board the USS Ino. He was then transferred to the merchantman Harvest Home, on which he was subjected to cruel treatment; he bore the marks of the shackles he wore for the rest of his life. He was imprisoned at Fort Warren. "The entire proceedings were deemed at the time as partaking in the character of an outrage," wrote The New York Times in Myers' obituary. His experience was discussed in the House of Commons.

At the end of the war, in 1865, Myers went to Jacksonville, Florida, where he was employed in the city's waterworks.

Myers married Jane Eliza Green, daughter of Benjamin Green and Martha Elizabeth Marvin, in 1867. 

He was an occasional contributor to The New York Times.

Death
Myers died on March 20, 1901, aged 73 or 74. He was buried in St. James Episcopal Cemetery in Marietta, Georgia. His wife joined him there upon her death 22 years later.

References

1827 births
1901 deaths
Confederate States Navy officers
United States Navy officers
Military personnel from Savannah, Georgia